The 2006 AFC U-17 Championship was the 12th competition of the AFC U-17 Championship organized by the Asian Football Confederation (AFC), which was held between 3 and 19 September 2006 in Singapore. Japan won their second title with a 4–2 win against Korea DPR in the final.

Qualification Competition

Laos won Group I in the qualification and were drawn to Group C in the finals, but were later disqualified for fielding over-aged players in a U-13 tournament in Qatar. Australia, which finished behind Laos in the qualification, did not take the slot, hence no replacement was made for Laos. Therefore, only fifteen teams competed in the final tournament.

Stadiums

Group stage
All times are Singapore Standard Time (UTC+8)

Group A

Group B

Group C

Group D

Knockout stage
All times are Singapore Standard Time (UTC+8)

Bracket

Quarterfinal

Semi-finals

Third place playoff

Final

Winners

Awards

Countries to participate in 2007 FIFA U-17 World Cup
 

 
 
 (host nation)

Goalscorers

References
 RSSSF Archive

 
U-17 Championship
International association football competitions hosted by Singapore
AFC U-17 Championship
2006 in youth association football
AFC U-17 Championships